Koso is a surname with multiple origins.

Naga family name

Other derivations 
People with the family name Koso, but unrelated to the Naga root above, include:
 Kazuhiro Koso (b. 1959), Japanese football player
 Enver Koso (b. 1956), Bosnian handball player

See also 
Koso (disambiguation) (other meanings)